The 1968–69 National Football League was the 38th staging of the National Football League (NFL), an annual Gaelic football tournament for the Gaelic Athletic Association county teams of Ireland.

Kerry beat Offaly in the home final, and then New York in the two-legged final.

Format

Divisions
 Division One: 8 teams. Split into two groups of 4.
 Division Two: 8 teams. Split into two groups of 4.
 Division Three: 8 teams. Split into two groups of 4. 
 Division Four: 8 teams. Split into two groups of 4.

The top 2 in each group progressed to the Division Semi-finals. The winners of the Division Finals played off in the NFL semi-finals.

Round-robin format
 Division Three (A): Played as a double round-robin.
 All other groups: Single Round-Robin. Each team played every other team in its division (or group where the division is split) once, either home or away.

Points awarded
2 points were awarded for a win and 1 for a draw.

Titles
Teams in all four divisions competed for the National Football League title.

Promotion and relegation

None. All divisions had equal status.

Knockout-phase results and tables

Division One

Division One (A) regulation games

Division One (B) play-offs

Division One inter-group play-offs

Division One (A) table

Division One (B) table

Division Two

Division Two (A) play-offs

Division Two inter-group play-offs

Division Two (A) table

Division Two (B) table

Division Three

Division Three (A) regulation games

Division Three (A) play-offs

Division Three inter-group play-offs

Division Three (A) table

Division Three (B) table

Division Four

Division Four (B) play-offs

Division Four inter-group play-offs

Division Four (A) table

Division Four (B) table

Knockout-phase results

Semi-finals

Finals

Kerry win 39–30 on aggregate.

References

National Football League
National Football League
National Football League (Ireland) seasons